is a masculine Japanese given name.

Possible writings
Naoto can be written using different kanji characters and can mean:
直人, "honesty, person"
尚人, "esteem, person"
直登, "honesty, ascend"
尚登, "esteem, ascend"
直斗, "honesty, Big Dipper"
猶人, "easy-going/graceful, person" 
The name can also be written in hiragana or katakana.

People with the name 
, Japanese footballer
, Japanese footballer
Naoto Fukasawa (直人, born 1956), Japanese industrial designer
Naoto Hikosaka (born 1962), professional Go player
, Japanese footballer
Naoto Hirooka (直人, born 1978), Japanese avant-garde fashion designer
Naoto Hiroyama (直人), the guitarist and headman of the J-rock band Orange Range
Naoto Nakamura or Naoto Inti Raymi (直人, born 1979), singer-songwriter
, Japanese ski jumper
Naoto Kan (直人, born 1946), Japanese politician - former Prime Minister of Japan
Naoto Kataoka  (片岡 直人, born 1983), Japanese dancer, actor, rapper and creative director
Naoto Kine (尚登), the guitarist of the Japanese band TM NETWORK
Naoto Matsukura (直人, born 1993), Japanese radio-controlled car racer
Naoto Matsuo (born 1979), Japanese football player
, Japanese water polo player
Naoto Ohshima (直人, born 1964), original character designer of Sonic the Hedgehog and Dr. Robotnik
Naoto Otake (直人, born 1968), Japanese football player
, Japanese rugby union player
Naoto Sakurai (born 1975), Japanese football player
Naoto Sato (直人), Japanese astronomer
Naoto Tajima (直人, 1912–1990), Japanese athlete and gold medalist
Naoto Takenaka (直人, born 1956), Japanese actor, comedian, singer, and director
Naoto Tsuji (直人, born 1989), Japanese basketball player
Naoto Watanabe (born 1980), Nippon Baseball player
Naoto Shibata (直人), bass guitarist of the Japanese band Anthem
Naoto (猶人), bass guitarist of the Japanese band exist trace

Fictional characters
Naoto Date (直人), the protagonist of the manga and anime series Tiger Mask
Naoto Date (直人), one of the supporting characters in the Japanese drama series Jotei
Naoto Fuyumine (直人), one of the main characters in the Dogs: Bullets & Carnage series
Naoto Kirihara (直人), the main character in the J-drama Night Head and Night Head Genesis anime
Naoto Kurogane (ナオト), a supporting character in the BlazBlue video game series
Naoto Sho (直人), the main hero of the Japanese tokusatsu series Gridman the Hyper Agent
Naoto Shirogane (直斗), one of the main characters in the game Persona 4
Naoto Kōzuki (直人), a minor character from the anime Code Geass
Naoto Takayama ((高山 直人), the main protagonist of the manga and anime series Rail Wars!
Naoto Takizawa, the sixth ranger of the Super Sentai season "Mirai Sentai Timeranger"
Naoto Miura (見浦ナオト), one of the main characters of the manga and anime series Clockwork Planet

See also
H. Naoto (born 1978), Japanese fashion brand
6025 Naotosato, a Main-belt Asteroid
Naota, the main character of FLCL

Japanese masculine given names